Events from the year 1433 in France

Incumbents
 Monarch – Charles VII

Births
 Francis II, Duke of Brittany (died 1488)
 Charles the Bold, Duke of Burgundy (died 1477)

Deaths
 Jean de Brosse, courtier (born 1375)
 Joan of France, Duchess of Brittany (born 1391)

References

1430s in France